Wyszogród may refer to the following places in Poland:
Wyszogród, a town in Masovian Voivodeship (central Poland)
Wyszogród, Lower Silesian Voivodeship (south-west Poland)
Wyszogród, Świętokrzyskie Voivodeship (south-central Poland)
, in Kuyavian-Pomeranian Voivodeship, mid-northern Poland

See also
Vyshgorod (disambiguation)
Visegrad (disambiguation)
Višegrad (disambiguation)